Rebecca Peta White (born 4 February 1983) is an Australian politician. She has been the Leader of the Opposition in Tasmania and Leader of the Parliamentary Labor Party in Tasmania since July 2021, having previously served in that role from March 2017 until May 2021. She has been a member of the Tasmanian House of Assembly in the electorate of Lyons since the 2010 state election. Before she was leader, White served as Shadow Minister for Health and Human Services, and Opposition Spokesperson for Children.

Early life and education
White grew up in Nugent, Tasmania, northeast of Hobart as a sixth generation Tasmanian. She attended Sorell School, Rosny College and the University of Tasmania, where she studied journalism, political science, and international business management and marketing. She graduated with Bachelor of Arts and Bachelor of Commerce degrees in 2004. She then worked as a political adviser for Labor MP for Denison Duncan Kerr and later Senator Carol Brown, and was Vice President of Tasmanian Young Labor.

Early political career (2010–2017)
For the 2010 Tasmanian state election, White was endorsed as one of the Labor candidates for Lyons. Her campaign focused on "renewal", pointing out that sitting MPs Michael Polley and David Llewellyn had both been in the parliament for over twenty years. Her advertising made use of Polly Waffle wrappers, "Pollywaffle" being a disparaging nickname for Polley. At the election, White narrowly defeated Llewellyn for the second Labor seat (also defeating the third sitting MP, Heather Butler).

White is aligned with Labor Left.

Opposition leader (2017–present) 
At a party meeting on 17 March 2017, Bryan Green resigned as Tasmanian Labor leader. White was elected leader unopposed, and hence Leader of the Opposition.

Almost immediately the Liberal Party went on the attack, releasing a fake CV titled "Student, party hack and MP" referencing White's youth and that she has never worked outside politics. White also expressed the hope that Shane Broad would fill the newly vacated seat, and promised to bring him into the ministry. Because of this the Liberals accused her of bribery, and referred her to the Tasmanian Electoral Commission. White responded that this stance "defies common sense".

White announced in December 2017 that under a Labor government she would phase out pokies in pubs and clubs thus breaking the decades long monopoly of Federal Hotels. The reason given was to protect people with mental health issues and the lower socio-economic strata, both of whom are susceptible to pokies addictions. Tasmanians lose over $110 million on pokies every year. This phase out would take until 2023, and would come with a package to help pubs and clubs transition to other forms of revenue. Following the election, White and the Labor party backtracked on their commitment to block the new licences under pressure from the federal party.

In February 2018, she declared the ALP would not be supporting the Liberals in attempting to re-introduce the state's anti-protest laws. White promised in the campaign to fund abortion clinics, after the Liberal government cut all funds to them. At the election in March, White led Labor to a three-seat gain, while paring the Liberals back to a bare majority of one seat.

White led Labor to another defeat in the 2021 election and subsequently resigned as leader. Following the resignation of the new party leader David O'Byrne just three weeks into the job, White was re-elected as party leader on 7 July 2021.

Personal life 
White married her partner, Rod Dann in a ceremony in November 2017. She has one daughter, Mia, and a son, Hudson. Mia was less than a year old when White was elevated to the leadership, and was regularly with White on the campaign trail in 2017. In February 2021, White revealed that she was expecting a second child, due in June 2021.

See also
2018 Tasmanian state election
1968 Tasmanian casino referendum

References

External links

1983 births
Living people
Members of the Tasmanian House of Assembly
Australian Labor Party members of the Parliament of Tasmania
Leaders of the Opposition in Tasmania
University of Tasmania alumni
21st-century Australian politicians
21st-century Australian women politicians
Women members of the Tasmanian House of Assembly